This is the list of religious organizations based in Estonia. The list is incomplete.

Christian organizations
 Estonian Evangelical Lutheran Church
 Union of Free Evangelical and Baptist Churches of Estonia
 United Methodist Church in Estonia
 Estonian Apostolic Orthodox Church
 Estonian Orthodox Church of the Moscow Patriarchate

Non-Christian organizations
 Estonian Islamic Congregation
 Maavalla Koda
 Emujärve Koda
 Härjapea Koda 
 Emajõe Koda
 Maausuliste Saarepealne Koda

References 

Religious organizations